Mazraeh-ye Shomali Rural District is a rural district (dehestan) in Voshmgir District, Aqqala County, Golestan Province, Iran. At the 2006 census, its population was 13,399, in 2,732 families.  The rural district has 16 villages.

References 

Rural Districts of Golestan Province
Aqqala County